The Neville-Patterson-Lamkin House, on Kentucky Route 80 in Arlington, Kentucky, was listed on the National Register of Historic Places in 1976.

It is a two-story five-bay brick house built around 1873, with a rear one-story ell extending east.  Its brick is laid in common bond.  A Victorian-style porch was removed and replaced by another porch.

References

National Register of Historic Places in Carlisle County, Kentucky
Houses completed in 1873
1873 establishments in Kentucky
Houses on the National Register of Historic Places in Kentucky